Ingle may refer to:

People
 Ingle (surname), includes a list of people with the name
 Ingle Martin (born 1982), American former football quarterback

Places in the United States
 Ingle, California, a community
 Ingle, Florida, an unincorporated community
 Ingle, Wisconsin, an unincorporated community

See also
 Ingles
 Ingleby (disambiguation)
 Inglenook (disambiguation)